The 1926 Maryland Aggies football team represented the University of Maryland in the 1926 college football season. In their 16th season under head coach Curley Byrd, the Aggies compiled a 5–4–1 record (1–3–1 in conference), finished in 17th place in the Southern Conference, and outscored their opponents 161 to 93.

Schedule

References

Maryland
Maryland Terrapins football seasons
Maryland Aggies football